The dithionite is the oxyanion with the formula [S2O4]2−.  It is commonly encountered as the salt sodium dithionite.  For historical reasons, it is sometimes called hydrosulfite, but it contains no hydrogen and is not a sulfite. The dianion has a steric number of 4 and trigonal pyramidal geometry.

Production and reactions
In its main applications, dithionite is generally prepared in situ by reduction of sulfur dioxide by sodium borohydride, described by the following idealized equation:.

Dithionite is a reducing agent.  At pH 7, the potential is −0.66 V vs NHE.  Redox occurs with formation of sulfite:
  +  2 H2O   →   2   +  2 e− +  2 H+
Dithionite undergoes acid hydrolytic disproportionation to thiosulfate and bisulfite:
2  + H2O →  + 2 
It also undergoes alkaline hydrolytic disproportionation to sulfite and sulfide:
3 Na2S2O4 + 6 NaOH → 5 Na2SO3 + Na2S + 3 H2O

It is formally derived from dithionous acid (H2S2O4), but this acid does not exist in any practical sense.

Use and occurrence
Sodium dithionite finds widespread use in industry as a reducing agent.  It is for example used in bleaching of pulp and some dyes.

Niche
Dithionite is used in conjunction with complexing agents (for example, citric acid) to reduce iron(III) oxy-hydroxide into soluble iron(II) compounds and to remove amorphous iron(III)-bearing mineral phases in soil analyses (selective extraction).

The decomposition of dithionite produces reduced species of sulfur that can be very aggressive for the corrosion of steel and stainless steel. Thiosulfate is known to induce pitting corrosion, whereas sulfide (S2−, HS−) is responsible for stress corrosion cracking (SCC).

References

Reducing agents
Corrosion
 
Sulfur oxyanions